Paolo Vallesi (born 18 May 1964) is an Italian singer-songwriter.

Background 
Born in Florence, Vallesi began studying piano as a child and he later started working as an arranger and a composer. Put under contract by Caterina Caselli, in 1991 he had his breakout with the song "Le persone inutili" which won the newcomer section at the Sanremo Music Festival and with his first album, Paolo Vallesi, which was a commercial success. The following year he came back to the Sanremo Festival, this time in its "Big Artists" section, ranking third with the song "La forza della vita", which  peaked first on the Italian hit parade. Following the sales dropping of his 1996 album Vallesi considerably slowed his musical activities in the following years. In 2005 he was a contestant in La Talpa, the Italian celebrity version of the reality series The Mole.

Discography
Album 
  
     1991 - Paolo Vallesi
     1992 - La forza della vita
     1994 - Non mi tradire
     1996 - Non essere mai grande
     1999 - Sabato 17:45
 2002 - Felici di essere (collection with 3 new songs)
 2015 - Episodio 1...In questo mondo

References

External links

 

1964 births
Musicians from Florence
Italian pop singers
Italian male singer-songwriters
Italian singer-songwriters
Living people
Sanremo Music Festival winners of the newcomers section